Hypoleucis tripunctata, the unmarked costus skipper, is a species of butterfly in the family Hesperiidae. It is found in Guinea, Sierra Leone, Liberia, Ivory Coast, Ghana, Togo, Nigeria, Cameroon, the Republic of the Congo, the Democratic Republic of the Congo and Uganda. The habitat consists of forests.

Adults are attracted to flowers.

The larvae feed on Aframomum latifolium and Aframomum sceptrum.

Subspecies
Hypoleucis tripunctata tripunctata (Guinea, Sierra Leone, Liberia, Ivory Coast, Ghana, Togo)
Hypoleucis tripunctata draga Evans, 1937 (central and eastern Democratic Republic of the Congo, Uganda)
Hypoleucis tripunctata truda Evans, 1937 (Nigeria, Cameroon, Congo)

References

Butterflies described in 1891
Hesperiinae
Butterflies of Africa